Sholeh-ye Zardu (also romanized as Sholeh-ye Zārdū) is a village in Sardasht Rural District, Zeydun District, Behbahan County, Khuzestan Province, Iran. At the 2006 census, its population was 274, in 59 families.

References 

Populated places in Behbahan County